Malý Kamenec is a village and municipality, in the Trebišov District, in the Košice Region of south-eastern Slovakia.

History
In historical records the village was first mentioned in 1358.

Geography
The village lies at an altitude of 114 metres and covers an area of 5.64 km².
It has a population of about 455 people.

Ethnicity
The village is about 94% Hungarian and 6% Slovak.

Facilities
The village has a public library and a football pitch.

External links
https://www.webcitation.org/5QjNYnAux?url=http://www.statistics.sk/mosmis/eng/run.html

Villages and municipalities in Trebišov District
Zemplín (region)